Empire Conveyor was a  shelter deck cargo ship that was built in 1917 as Farnworth by Richardson, Duck and Company, Thornaby-on-Tees, England. After a sale in 1924 she was renamed Illinois. In 1926, she was sold to France, and in 1934 to Greece and was renamed Mount Pentelikon. In 1939, she was sold to Germany and was renamed Gloria.

At the outbreak of the Second World War she was in Buenos Aires, Argentina. She tried to return to Germany but was captured by the Royal Navy, passed to the Ministry of War Transport (MoWT) and renamed Empire Conveyor.

Description

The boilers fed a 440 NHP triple expansion steam engine that was built by Blair & Co Ltd of Stockton-on-Tees.

History

Richardson, Duck and Company of Thornaby-on-Tees built Farnworth was built for R.S. Dalgleish Ltd, Newcastle upon Tyne and completed her in June 1917. She was allocated the United Kingdom Official Number 140672. Farnworth was used on routes serving the east and west coast of the United States, the Caribbean and West Indies. In 1924, she was sold to the Harlem Steamship Co Ltd, Newcastle upon Tyne and was renamed Illinois. She was initially operated under the management of F Newson. Later in 1924, management was transferred to Brown, Jenkinson & Co Ltd. In 1926 she was transferred to Compagnie Générale Transatlantique. Her port of registry was Le Havre and the Code Letters OTRW were allocated. On 17 March 1932, Illinois was laid up at Roscanvel. In 1934, Illinois was sold to Kulukundis Shipping Co, Piraeus, Greece and renamed Mount Pentelikon. She was placed under the management of Rethymnis & Kulukundis Ltd. Her port of registry was changed to Piraeus and the Code Letters SVAV were allocated.

In 1939, Mount Pentelikon was sold to Orion Schiffahrts GmbH, Rostock, Germany. She was operated under the management of E Behnke. The Code Letters DHBB were allocated. At the outbreak of the Second World War Gloria was at Buenos Aires, Argentina. She departed Buenos Aires on 6 October, bound for Hamburg. During the voyage into Kirkwall, three of her crew attempted to escape by lifeboat but were recaptured and taken to Methil, Scotland.

Gloria was passed to the MoWT and renamed Empire Conveyor. Her port of registry was changed to London, and the Code Letters GLTN were allocated. Empire Conveyor regained her Official Number 140572. Her radio aerials were damaged in the attack and Empire Conveyor was unable to call for assistance. She was spotted by a Royal Air Force Sunderland aircraft, which attacked U-122 and drove her away. Empire Conveyor sank before the ships reached her. The crew took to the lifeboats and liferafts but one of them was swamped at launch, killing the captain, Finlay Macintyre, the second engineer and the cook. Thirty-eight survivors were rescued by HMS Campbell and landed at Liverpool on 21 June. Empire Conveyor was the only ship sunk by U-122. Those lost on Empire Conveyor are commemorated at the Tower Hill Memorial, London.

References

External links
Photo of Farnworth
Photo of Farnworth

1917 ships
Empire ships
Maritime incidents in October 1939
Maritime incidents in June 1940
Merchant ships of France
Merchant ships of Germany
Merchant ships of the United Kingdom
Ministry of War Transport ships
Shipwrecks of Scotland
Ships of Counties Ship Management
Ships of the Compagnie Générale Transatlantique
Ships sunk by German submarines in World War II
World War II shipwrecks in the Atlantic Ocean
Steamships of France
Steamships of Germany
Steamships of the United Kingdom
Ships built on the River Tees
World War I merchant ships of the United Kingdom
World War II merchant ships of Germany